Zachariah Glenn Fulmer (born March 27, 1940) was an American politician in the state of South Carolina. He served in the South Carolina House of Representatives as a member of the Democratic Party from 1972 to 1974 and 1967 to 1968, representing Aiken County, South Carolina. He is a farmer and businessman.

References

1940 births
Living people
Democratic Party members of the South Carolina House of Representatives